Randolph Columbus Barrett House is a historic home located at Doniphan, Ripley County, Missouri.  It was built in 1881, and is a two-story, three bay, "T"-plan, frame dwelling with Classical Revival style design influences.  It has a two-story front portico with rails at both levels, bracketed cornice and coupled posts, a semi-octagonal bay with bracketed cornice, and a two-story side gallery porch on the  side of the rear wing.

It was added to the National Register of Historic Places in 1976.

References

Houses on the National Register of Historic Places in Missouri
Neoclassical architecture in Missouri
Houses completed in 1881
Buildings and structures in Ripley County, Missouri
National Register of Historic Places in Ripley County, Missouri